Eupithecia scalptata is a moth in the family Geometridae first described by Hugo Theodor Christoph in 1885. It is found from Albania and Greece to the Lower Volga region (the Volgograd oblast in Russia) in the north-east and Turkmenistan and Iran in the south-east.

References

Moths described in 1885
scalptata
Moths of Europe
Moths of Asia